John Theodore "Jack" Reed (born July 5, 1946) is an American businessman, author, and former real estate investor. Reed has written and self-published books on real estate investing, football coaching, baseball coaching, success, and self-publishing.

Reed, who claims many years of experience in property management,  considers real estate investment a hands-on business.  He has been writing and publishing "nuts-and-bolts guides devoid of motivational or promotional filler" since 1979.  Reed also publishes the Real Estate Investor’s Monthly newsletter.

The most popular feature  on John Reed's website is his real estate "guru" rating,  with his opinions of the legitimacy of their claims.  Those whom Reed critiques include Robert G. Allen,  Robert Kiyosaki,  Carleton Sheets and Russ Whitney.  Whitney sued Reed for three years, later withdrawing some of the suits and settling another on confidential terms.

Reed was born in New Jersey and graduated from the United States Military Academy with a B.S. degree in 1968. He was commissioned as a United States Army officer, served in Vietnam from 1969 to 1970 and left active duty in 1972 as a first lieutenant. Reed later earned an M.B.A. degree from the Harvard Business School in 1977.

References

External links
Official site
John T. Reed Quotes

1946 births
Living people
Place of birth missing (living people)
United States Military Academy alumni
Military personnel from New Jersey
United States Army officers
United States Army personnel of the Vietnam War
Harvard Business School alumni
American finance and investment writers
American instructional writers
American investors
American real estate businesspeople
Businesspeople from California
People from Alamo, California
Writers from California